Stephanie Nielson is a Latter-Day-Saint mommy blogger, burn survivor and until 2021 author of the blog "The NieNie Dialogues". She is also the younger sister of another popular blogger, C. Jane Kendrick.

Plane crash and recovery
In 2008, Nielson was in a serious plane crash with her husband Christian and burned over 80% of her body. She was in a coma for three months and then underwent many operations, skin grafts, and physical therapy in a painful, ongoing treatment regimen. Her recovery process led to a large increase in publicity including interviews with Oprah Winfrey, Today, and a popular YouTube "Mormon Message" video for the Church of Jesus Christ of Latter-day Saints.

A year after her accident, she hiked the "Y", a rocky path near her parents' house, with her family and dozens of fans to demonstrate how far she had come.

Blogging style, fanbase, and appeal
Nielson is known for her positive approach to life, especially motherhood, influenced in part by her strong religious convictions. Her fans credit her with inspiring them to become better mothers and for "portraying motherhood as a celebration, not a grind" as well as "...'the highest calling on earth: a job full of color and vibrancy and of the utmost importance.'"

As with many other Mormon mommy bloggers, Nielson attracted attention for her large base of readers who are either not Latter-Day-Saints, not mothers, or both. A Salon article entitled  "Why I Can't Stop Reading Mormon Housewife Blogs", by Emily Matchar, a self-described "young, feminist atheist who can't bake a cupcake" but is "addicted" to several Latter-Day-Saint housewife blogs, including Nielson's, examined this interesting phenomena.

"So why, exactly, are these blogs so fascinating to women like us -- secular, childless women who may have never so much as baked a cupcake, let alone reupholstered our own ottomans with thrifted fabric and vintage grosgrain ribbon?...to use a word that makes me cringe, these blogs are weirdly "uplifting." To read Mormon lifestyle blogs is to peer into a strange and fascinating world where the most fraught issues of modern living -- marriage and child rearing -- appear completely unproblematic. This seems practically subversive to someone like me, weaned on an endless media parade of fretful stories about "work-life balance" and soaring divorce rates and the perils of marrying too young/too old/too whatever.".

In response, MMB (Mormon Mommy Blogs) argued that although the article was right that these blogs provided something missing in other people's lives, this missing piece was spiritual.
"We told the producer that it's easy to learn about people through their blogs. You are getting to peek inside their homes, you are getting to see how other people are living. And not only that, but those Mormons, that you've only heard weird myths about, are out there, talking, and you're finding, that they are regular people. These are regular women, who[m] you admire. These are people just. like. you.
Some of them stay at home, some of them work. But they do it all with a grace and greater understanding of their purpose...
When we write about our personal struggles, we do so in a respectful and uplifting way. Yes, we struggle with depression. Yes, we argue with our husbands. Yes, our children even drive us nuts.... But through all of that, the readers of Mormon mommy blogs feel the love...
Mormon Mommy Bloggers are a powerful force for good in this world, and they are spreading that goodness by sharing their lives through their blogs. "

This interpretation would likely be close to Nielson's own, as she noted on a Latter-Day-Saint radio interview, among other places that she felt her readers were reaching the spirit of God through her writings. Blogging is highly popular (and officially encouraged) among Latter-Day-Saints as a way extending the Latter-Day-Saint community and of spreading the divine word, and the resulting community of Latter-Day-Saint blogs has come to be known as the Bloggernacle.

However, suddenly on 21 February 2021, Nielson wrote one final post on her blog citing 'Recede in priority' as her reason for giving up blogging. She then archived or deleted 17 years worth of posts - leaving just that one final post showing on the blog and a multitude of bewildered fans wondering what had suddenly happened. She announced her intention to occasionally post on Instagram in her closing statement.

Projects and causes
Nielson has supported a variety of projects and causes. She promotes the Church of Jesus Christ of Latter-Day-Saints and sends a copy of The Book of Mormon to any reader who requests it. Politically, Nielson campaigned for and encouraged her blog readers to support Mitt Romney in the 2012 US presidential election.

Nielson published her first book, Heaven is Here,  in the spring of 2012.

She spoke at the World Congress of Families IX.

References

External links
 The NieNie Dialogues

1981 births
American Latter Day Saint writers
Living people
Mormon bloggers
Mormon memoirists
Writers of blogs about home and family
American women bloggers
American bloggers
Survivors of aviation accidents or incidents
Burn survivors
American women memoirists
21st-century American memoirists
21st-century American women